The PowerBook 190 and its companion PowerBook 190cs are laptop computers manufactured by Apple Computer as part of their PowerBook brand, introduced to the market in August 1995. The two models differ only in their screen: the 190 had a 9.5" greyscale display, while the 190cs featured a 10.4" color display. Apple's target sales audience for this model was the college student in need of a no-frills portable computer.

In terms of hardware, along with the PowerBook 150, the 190 has much in common with Apple's "professional" laptop of the same period, the PowerBook 5300 series. In exchange for the cheaper price point (approximately US$2,200 compared to over US$6,000 for the cutting-edge PowerBook 5300ce), the 190 was equipped with a passive matrix LCD rather than a crisper active matrix screen.

More significantly, while the 5300s ran PowerPC 603e processors at 100 or 117 MHz, the 190 had only a Motorola 68LC040 clocked at 33 MHz - in fact, the 190/cs were the last Macintoshes to use a 68k CPU. However, Apple offered a PPC upgrade for the 190, a heavily marketed selling point for all new 68040 Macs at the time. In addition, a rather cramped 500 MB IDE hard drive was standard, and factory models shipped with System 7.5.2.

It is the only one of the 100 series PowerBooks that does not use the original 140 case design (except the PowerBook 100), thus was the only one to include a 68LC040 processor, a trackpad rather than the standard trackball, and along with the 150 the only ones to provide for more than 14 MB RAM expansion and larger, less-expensive IDE drives. The 190 was the de facto replacement for the PowerBook 500 series, which was completely discontinued with the introduction of the 5300 and the only 68040-based PowerBook Apple offered.

Sales figures for the 190 are unavailable, but in any event it did not benefit from reports of "exploding battery syndrome," where the similar 5300 factory-default lithium-ion battery could short-circuit and burst into flames. Apple quickly offered a recall on all such batteries. The PowerBook 190 series used a nickel metal hydride battery which did not exhibit this problem.

Production of the 190 halted in June 1996, while the 190cs was sold until October of that year, when it was replaced by the PowerBook 1400cs.

Timeline

External links 
 Apple's datasheets: PowerBook 190, PowerBook 190cs
 apple-history.com: PowerBook 190, PowerBook 190cs

190
68k Macintosh computers